The 5th West Virginia Cavalry Regiment was a cavalry regiment that served in the Union Army during the American Civil War.

Service
The 5th West Virginia Cavalry Regiment was organized from the 2nd West Virginia Infantry Regiment on January 26, 1864. The regiment was consolidated into a single battalion at Charles Town, West Virginia, in September 1864 and was absorbed by the 6th West Virginia Cavalry Regiment on December 14, 1864.

Casualties
The 5th West Virginia Cavalry Regiment suffered 3 officers and 68 enlisted men killed or mortally wounded in battle and 118 enlisted men dead from disease for a total of 189 fatalities.

Commanding officers
Colonel George R. Latham

See also
West Virginia Units in the Civil War
West Virginia in the Civil War

References

External links
5th Regiment, West Virginia Cavalry National Park Service entry

Units and formations of the Union Army from West Virginia
1864 establishments in West Virginia
Military units and formations established in 1864
Military units and formations disestablished in 1864